Total War Saga: Troy is a 2020 turn-based strategy video game developed by Creative Assembly Sofia and published by Sega. The game was released for Windows on 13 August 2020 as the second installment in the Total War Saga subseries, succeeding Thrones of Britannia (2018). The game received generally positive reviews upon release.

Gameplay
Like its predecessors, Total War Saga: Troy is a turn-based strategy game with real-time tactics elements. The game is set in the Bronze Age, during the Trojan War, though its scope also covers the surrounding Aegean civilizations. Real-time battles take place in large sandboxes, and players can command the infantry, hero units as well as mystical beasts as they battle opponent forces. There are a total of eight heroes representing the two factions (the Trojans and the Achaeans), and each hero has two unique abilities that can be used during battles. As the player progress in the game, they can also build their relationship with the Greek gods. If the approval ratings with the Gods are high enough, the player would gain gameplay benefits. Outside of battles, players also need to collect sufficient resources, such as wood, bronze and food, in order to keep the army running. Agents return in Troy, and players can send priests and spies to infiltrate hostile cities. Multiplayer, which supports up to 8 players, was introduced on November 26, 2020.

Development
The game is the second installment in the Total War Saga subseries, following 2018's Total War Saga: Thrones of Britannia. Troy, similar to its predecessor, was designed to be a shorter but more focused game, and its scope was limited to a particular time period in history instead of being era-spanning. The lead developer is Creative Assembly Sofia based in Bulgaria, which took approximately two years and nine months to develop the game. According to Maya Georgieva, the game's director, the Bronze Age was a very difficult setting to work on due to the lack of detailed historical records and sources. As a result, the team resorted to using the Iliad, an ancient Greek epic poem, to fill up the historical details that were missing. Despite the mythical elements, the team tried to make the game as historically grounded as possible. Georgieva called this approach "truth behind the myth", in which the team came up with the "most probable explanations for the myths and legends to complete the history". For instance, the Trojan horse would be an earthquake, a siege tower, or a massive wooden structure instead of a huge, wooden horse. While a second "Historical Mode" was added as a Free DLC along with the "Mythos" Pack. The "Historical Mode" makes the game more truthful, adding bodyguards to leaders as "Truth Behind The Myth" has none, Along with that it removes Truth Behind The Myth's Passive buffs from Gods and adds only slight bonuses from supporting them.

Total War Saga: Troy was announced by publisher Sega on 19 September 2019. It was released on 13 August 2020 for Windows via the Epic Games Store, where it was exclusively available for one year. Creative Assembly later confirmed that this was a one-off deal with Epic Games, and added that they did not plan to make future Total War games exclusive to a storefront. As Creative Assembly hoped to expand the audience of the franchise, the game was made free to claim for the first 24 hours after its release. 7.5 million people claimed the game for free on that day, exceeding the developer's expectations. Creative Assembly will be working with Epic to incorporate mod support upon the game's release. A downloadable content pack based on the Amazons was released on 24 September 2020.

Reception

The game received generally positive reviews upon release, according to review aggregator Metacritic.

The game was available for free in the Epic Games Store. This resulted in 7.5 million claimed copies in a single day.

Downloadable content
Following the game's release, Creative Assembly released several DLC packs for the game that added extra content such as new factions, leaders, and mission chains.

Explanatory notes

References

External links 
 

2020 video games
Ancient Greece in fiction
Creative Assembly games
Cultural depictions of the Trojan War
Fiction set in the 12th century BC
Fiction set in the 13th century BC
Grand strategy video games
Historical simulation games
Multiplayer and single-player video games
Sega video games
Strategy video games
Total War (video game series)
Video games based on Greek mythology
Video games based on works by Homer
Video games developed in Bulgaria
Video games set in Greece
Windows games
Works based on the Iliad